Đặng Thị Kiều Trinh (born 19 December 1985) is a retired Vietnamese footballer who plays as a goalkeeper for Hồ Chí Minh City I.

Honours

Club
Hồ Chí Minh City I W.F.C.
Vietnam women's football championship: 
 Winners :  2004, 2005, 2010, 2015, 2016, 2017
 Runners-up : 2013

Vietnam
Southeast Asian Games:
 Winners : 2009, 2015, 2017
 Runners-up : 2007, 2013
AFF Women's Championship:
 Winners : 2006, 2012
 Runners-up : 2008
Asian Games
  Fourth place  : 2014 Asian Games

Individuals
  Vietnamese Golden Ball   : 2011, 2012, 2017
  Vietnamese Silver Ball   : 2009, 2010, 2014
  Vietnamese Bronze Ball   : 2016
  Best goalkeeper  of Vietnam women's football championship: 2010, 2011, 2013, 2015, 2016
  AFF Player of the Year (Women's)  : 2013

References

External links 
 

1985 births
Living people
Women's association football goalkeepers
Vietnamese women's footballers
Vietnam women's international footballers
Asian Games competitors for Vietnam
Footballers at the 2006 Asian Games
Footballers at the 2010 Asian Games
Footballers at the 2014 Asian Games
Southeast Asian Games gold medalists for Vietnam
Southeast Asian Games medalists in football
Competitors at the 2009 Southeast Asian Games
Competitors at the 2017 Southeast Asian Games
Southeast Asian Games silver medalists for Vietnam
Competitors at the 2007 Southeast Asian Games
Competitors at the 2013 Southeast Asian Games
21st-century Vietnamese women